Bruce Codd (born February 23, 1978 in Orangeville, Ontario) is a lacrosse player for the Toronto Rock in the National Lacrosse League.

Codd began his NLL career with the Albany Attack in 2000. He played one season in each of Albany, Columbus, Montreal, and Ottawa before settling in Arizona for four seasons. When the Sting ceased operations after the 2007 season, Codd was chosen by Calgary in the dispersal draft. Codd remained in Calgary for four seasons before signing a two-year contract with the Toronto Rock as a free agent before the 2012 season.

Statistics

NLL
Reference:

References

1978 births
Calgary Roughnecks players
Canadian lacrosse players
Lacrosse people from Ontario
Living people
People from Orangeville, Ontario
Toronto Rock players